Testosterone acetate (brand names Aceto-Sterandryl, Aceto-Testoviron, Amolisin, Androtest A, Deposteron, Farmatest, Perandrone A), or testosterone ethanoate, also known as androst-4-en-17β-ol-3-one 17β-acetate, is an androgen and anabolic steroid and a testosterone ester. The drug was first described in 1936 and was one of the first androgen esters and esters of testosterone to be synthesized.

See also
 List of androgen esters

References

Acetate esters
Androgens and anabolic steroids
Androstanes
Ketones
Testosterone esters